Qasr-e Shirin (also Romanized as Qaşr-e Shīrīn and Qasr-ī-Shīrīn; also known as Ghasr-ī-shīrīn and Ghasr-shīrīn) is a city and capital of Qasr-e Shirin County, Kermanshah Province, Iran.  At the 2006 census, its population was 15,437, in 3,893 families. It is an FTZ and is populated by Kurds.

Name 
The city is named after Shirin, the Christian wife of the Sasanian King of Kings (shahanshah) Khosrow II.

History

Sassanid era
Historical and literary works attribute the building of the  city to Khosrow Parviz of the Sassanids. The city was a metropolitan during the Sassanid era (226-651 CE). Qasr-e Shirin, a city with over 2000 years of history, was famous for being the city of love.

Iran-Iraq war (1980-1988)

Postwar reconstruction-present 
In 1992 the postwar reconstruction process began. The results of a research in 2020 show that the reconstruction process of Qasr-e Shirin was not successful in reviving the city nor in encouraging the migrants to return to their hometown.

In June 2006, archaeological excavations in Shirin's castle resulted in the discovery of the dais of the castle which was used as the seat of the king. The establishment of Qasr-e Shirin free trade-industrial zone was approved on May 5, 2021.

Climate
The city is known for its agricultural productivity due to rich soil and plentiful water from the Alwand River, which runs through the city. The weather is mild in winter but hot and dry during the summer. The results of a  research done in 2018 on determining the vulnerability of fish farmers towards climate change in Qasr-e Shirin, revealed that climate change had a major impact on fish loss, shortened production cycle and lower fish production. 

Dust storms in recent years have troubled people.

Demographics

Language 
The linguistic composition of the city:

Recent excavations
The site of Qasr-e shirin was searched for the first time in 1891 and again in 1910.

Excavations in 2006 led to the discovery of a wall of forty miles long, built by Khosrow II to protect the city. This wall extends beyond the border with Iraq.
A canal dug at the time of the Sassanids, ends in Iraq. The water of the river Hulwan(Alwand) entered the channel by a trench and then led the water to Iraq. This canal covered with stucco stone is considered one of the masterpieces of civil engineering in irrigation.

A new round of archaeological excavation commenced in October 2022 at Saheli Street of the Qasr-e Shirin city. It was the second archaeological season that was aimed to study and explore the antiquity of the city and the relics discovered during previous excavations. A budget of 3.1 billion rials ($11,000) was allocated to the project.

Economy

Agriculture
Qasr-e Shirin is especially known for its date palm trees and lemon. The agriculture organization of Qasr-e Shirin is building the biggest garden in the middle east.

Border trade
Qasr-e Shirin has for long played an important economical role in the region. A large share of the country's exports to Iraq is done via Qasr-e Shirin with its two main border terminals Parviz border and Khosravi. In the Iranian calendar year 1393 (21 March 2014-20 March 2015) commodities worth $1.9 billion were exported to Iraq through the border crossings of Qasr-e Shirin. There are trading companies active in doing exports to Iraq.

Parviz border crossing (Persian: گذرگاه مرزی پرویز) is located to the northwest at a 5 Kms distance from the city center. It was established in 1997. The reason for being named so is a village by the same name on the Kurdish Iraq side of the border.About 50 percent of Iran’s non-oil products are being exported to Iraq via Parviz border crossing, a major land route for trade. On average, 800-1,200 trucks carrying Iranian goods pass Parviz border crossing and head for Iraq daily.Also, an average of 500 tankers import fuel from Iraq's Kurdistan region to Parviz border per day and return to Iraq after being discharged at Iran's southern ports. According to Yavar Mohammadi, one governor of the western Iranian city of Qasr-e Shirin, Parviz border crossing plays a significant role in the prosperity of the Iranian economy, Kermanshah Province in particular. Parviz border crossing has been named the most active trade checkpoint out of 86 crossings between Iran and Iraq. It has put thosands of Iranians to work. In the year (March 2021-22), exports to Iraq from this terminal stood at 2.53 million tons worth $1.02 billion.

Tourism

Qasr-e Shirin & Khosravi
Qasr-e Shirin and Khosravi have many modern and chic hotels and restaurants, with five three-star hotels and other two-star hotels, serving both pilgrims to Iraq's holy Shia shrines and tourists and businessmen visiting the city. Because of Khosravi border closure to caravan pilgrims from June 2013 till September 2019 and again during the coronavirus pandemic, which the hospitality industry is heavily dependent on, the industry went through recession. However, Iran and Iraq reached an agreement to resume the regular dispatching of caravan pilgrims starting 21 November 2022 from Khosravi border crossing. Religious tourists from northern, northwestern and central Iranian provinces are to be dispatched to Iraq after spending one night at Qasr-e Shirin and Khosravi hotels. Hotels in the area include:
Kasra hotel
Arg hotel
Jowan hotel
Marmar hotel
Sahand hotel
Siavash hotel
Samen hotel in Khosravi
Imam Reza hotel in Khosravi 
Abi Abdallah hotel in Khosravi

Valiasr hotel has been changed into a pharmacy.

Parviz border crossing
Parviz border's passenger hall was inaugurated on 3 February 2015. Of all the common border crossings between Iran and Iraq, crossing the border using a private car is possible only through Parviz border crossing.

Infrastructure

Transport

Roads
The main access road is the Kermanshah-Khosravi highway through the ring road. The other one is a two-lane road to Gilan-e Gharb. The resurfacing of 9 kilometers of this road with a 120 billion rial budget began in October 2022.It is an alternative route to Eslamabad-e Gharb and Kermanshah using the Ghalajeh tunnel.
It also gives access to Ilam province after the small remaining part of miandar road in the Gilan-e Gharb-Eyvan route was paved in 2015 and made the distance to Ilam province around 40 Kms shorter through this road.

Rail
The city is near a railway route under construction called Rahahane Gharb (Iran west railway) planned to connect Iran to Iraqi railway system and ultimately to the Syrian Mediterranean port city of Latakia. Its construction is due to be completed by 1405 Iranian year through Kermanshah–Khosravi line. Qasr-e Shirin FTZ is considered the connecting point of Kermanshah railway to Baghdad railway.

Air
There is no airport serving the city. However after the approval of its free trade zone there have been calls for the urgency of the construction of a small scale airport in order for the  FTZ to prosper.  It would be the second airport in Kermanshah province.Kermanshah Airport which is the regional hub is the nearest airport.

Health systems
Hazrate Abolfazl Abbas is the hospital that serves the town and people from Iraq.  It has 96 beds. Built in 1998 during the postwar reconstruction process, because of the lack of medical specialists it functioned at the level of a round the clock clinic until early January 2006 when some specialists joined and a few specialty wards were activated.  There is also a sanitation center and a 24-hour drugstore. Due to the city's two border crossings with Iraq and its proximity to several Iraqi cities it attracts and has the potential to attract Iraqi medical tourists. According to Sa’dollah Masudian, the Iranian consul general in Iraq's Sulaymaniyah Governorate in June 2018, each day 1500 visas are issued for Iraqi travelers to Iran at Iran's consulate in Sulaymaniyah, one third of which is dedicated for medical tourism.

International border crossings
There are two international border crossings. Parviz border crossing which is 5 kilometers away from the city center and borders the Kurdish region of Iraq and the much older Khosravi border crossing which is 18 kilometers away from the city on the way to Khanaqin and baghdad in Iraq.

Culture
Qasr-e Shirin anthropology museum was opened in August 2008. Because of a lack of staff its operation was later limited to the thirteen days of holiday during Newruz of every new year. It is one of the largest in Kermanshah Province.

Education

Higher education
The higher education center of Qasr-e Shirin which was an affiliate of Razi University was a public university in Qasr-e Shirin that was shut down in the first half of 2000s. Its buildings have been given to the following semi public and private universities: 
Payam Noor university of Qasr-e Shirin opened in 2007
Islamic Azad university of Qasr-e Shirin opened in 2006
There are plans to build the international campus of Razi university in Qasr-e Shirin.

See also 

Taq-e Gara
Naft shahr
Taq-i Kisra
Byzantine Empire
Mehran, Ilam
Treaty of Zuhab
Kalhori
Garmian Region
Arvand Free Zone
Kermanshah railway station
Baghdad Central Station

References

Sources

External links 
Kirmashan.com

Populated places in Qasr-e Shirin County
Cities in Kermanshah Province
Kurdish settlements in Kermanshah Province